The St. Thomas Tommies are the intercollegiate athletic teams that represent University of Saint Thomas. The school's athletic program includes 22 varsity sports teams. Their mascot is a Tiger named Tommie, and the school colors are purple and gray. The university participates in the NCAA's Division I as members of the Summit League in all varsity sports except for football, which competes in the Pioneer Football League, the men's ice hockey team, which competes in the Central Collegiate Hockey Association, and the women's ice hockey team, which competes in the Western Collegiate Hockey Association. St. Thomas offers 11 varsity sports for men and 11 for women.

History
Varsity intercollegiate sports began in 1904, and St. Thomas celebrated 100 years of varsity athletics in 2003–04. In 1920, St. Thomas was one of seven charter members of the Minnesota Intercollegiate Athletic Conference (MIAC).

Since 1973, when the MIAC became affiliated with NCAA Division III, St. Thomas has won more than one-third of the conference's 39 team championships, with 15 NCAA titles in eight different sports, as well as 13 NCAA team runner-up finishes, which includes three additional sports. Overall, St. Thomas has top-five national team finishes in 21 different sports.

In May 2019, the MIAC expelled St. Thomas from the league, due to concerns about "athletic competitive parity." As Sports Illustrated put it, "St. Thomas is just too good at sports for the rest of the MIAC," which was causing other teams to consider abandoning the league and threatening its continued existence.

On October 5, 2019, St. Thomas officially announced its intent to move directly from Division III to Division I, a move that had not occurred since the NCAA established Divisions I, II, and III in 1973, and that was specifically prohibited in 2011. Normally a transition from Division III to I requires a stop in Division II, an approximate 12-year process to complete. St. Thomas declared that it was requesting a waiver from the NCAA to allow the move, and also announced that it had been invited to join the Summit League, a Division I conference that was supporting the school's waiver request.

On July 15, 2020, the NCAA granted permission for St. Thomas to move directly from Division III to Division I beginning in 2021. Already invited to join the Summit League, all but three of the school's 22 teams will compete in the conference that championed its move up. The football team will join the Pioneer Football League, the non-scholarship football-only conference with teams in New York, North Carolina, South Carolina, Florida, Kentucky, Ohio, Indiana, Iowa, and California. Men's ice hockey would join the CCHA and the women's ice hockey team would play in the WCHA.

Sports sponsored

Source:

National championships
Association for Intercollegiate Athletics for Women (AIAW)
 Women's cross country 1981

National Collegiate Athletic Association (Division III)
 Women's cross country 1982, 1984, 1986, 1987
 Men's cross country 1984, 1986
 Baseball 2001, 2009
 Softball 2004, 2005
 Men's indoor track & field 1985
 Women's basketball 1991
 Men's basketball 2011, 2016
 Volleyball 2012

References

External links
 

 
University of St. Thomas (Minnesota)